Ralph Edward Dodge (January 25, 1907 – August 8, 2008) was an American bishop of The Methodist Church and the United Methodist Church, elected in 1956.  He was the youngest of four children of Ernest and Lizzie Longshore Dodge of Dickinson County, Iowa.

Call
After high school graduation, Dodge followed his father and older brother into farming. The family attended the Methodist Episcopal Church in Terril, Iowa. It was there that his pastor suggested God might be calling Dodge to preach. In spite of scoffing at the idea initially, Dodge earnestly wrestled with the possibility for several years. Finally, he decided to pursue this call, trusting that if God willed it, seemingly impassable doors would open.

Education
Dodge put himself through Taylor University, Upland, Indiana, by working for the university greenhouse and farm.  While at Taylor, Dodge met Eunice Davis, a coed from Little Valley, New York. They married in June 1934. After graduation from Taylor, Dodge went on to Boston University School of Theology.

Ordained ministry
After seminary graduation, Dodge served small churches in Massachusetts and North Dakota, but he and his wife both felt called to foreign missions work.

In 1935 they were accepted as candidates for a missionary opening in Angola, then called Portuguese West Africa.  The birth of their first child in January 1936 delayed their departure but, a few months later, they were in language school in Lisbon, Portugal.  They arrived in Portuguese West Africa December 1936.

Episcopal ministry
Dodge was elected bishop in 1956, the first Methodist bishop elected by the Africa Central Conference.  He was the only American Methodist missionary ever elected bishop by the Africa Central Conference, as well.  Previously bishops to Africa had been appointed from America. Dodge served as bishop in Africa until 1968, leading the African church through the turbulent years from colonial control to African leadership.  His episcopal area included the colonial territories of Angola, Mozambique, Rhodesia (now Zimbabwe) and Zaire (now the Democratic Republic of the Congo).

Until his death on August 8, 2008, Dodge lived in retirement in Inverness, Florida.

See also
 List of bishops of the United Methodist Church

References

Bishops of The Methodist Church (USA)
1907 births
2008 deaths
American Methodist missionaries
Taylor University alumni
Boston University School of Theology alumni
American autobiographers
American United Methodist bishops
American expatriates in Angola
Methodist missionaries in Angola
People from Dickinson County, Iowa
American centenarians
Men centenarians
People from Inverness, Florida